Stadionul Jean Pădureanu is a multi-purpose stadium in Bistrița, Romania. It is currently used mostly for football matches and is the home ground of Gloria Bistrița-Năsăud, considered the unofficial successor of ACF Gloria Bistrița. The stadium is named after the former president of Gloria Bistrița, Jean Pădureanu.

See also
List of football stadiums in Romania

References

Sport in Bistrița
Football venues in Romania
Multi-purpose stadiums in Romania